Frank Kreyer (born May 8, 1970) is an American racing driver from Wisconsin Dells, Wisconsin. He has started in NASCAR's Craftsman Truck Series and Busch Series.

Racing career
Kreyer began racing in half scale NASCAR cars in the Junior Cup series in 1995. He won four straight championships in 1995 to 1998. He competed in the series part-time in the 1999 season while working on the pit crew for NASCAR Midwest Series driver Jason Schuler.

Kreyer started racing Super Late Models at Madison International Speedway (MIS) and Wisconsin Dells Speedway (now Dells Raceway Park). Kreyer won his first Super Late Model feature at Wisconsin Dells, and was the track's Rookie of the Year. 

Kreyer competed full-time at Wisconsin Dells in 2001, finishing third in the final points. He also competed part-time in the Wisconsin Challenge Series that season. Kreyer competed at several tracks in Wisconsin in 2002. 

In 2003, Kreyer competed at full-time in the Wisconsin Challenge Series, and at Wisconsin Dells. He finished fourth at both the track and the roaming series. Kreyer competed in the Wisconsin Challenge Series and CRA Super Series in 2004.

Kreyer competed in the Wisconsin Challenge Series for the entire 2005 season, and finished tenth in the final points standings.

He competed in half of the American Speed Association late model races in 2006, but he was able to score enough points to finish in the Top 20 in points. Kreyer purchased Wisconsin Dells Speedway with two other co-owners, closing on the purchase of the track in February 2007, and renamed the track Dells Raceway Park. The new owners have brought the American Speed Association sanction to the track.

NASCAR career
Kreyer made his first NASCAR start in the Craftsman Truck Series at the Kroger 250 at Martinsville Speedway on March 31, 2007. He started 27th and finished 28th seven laps behind the leader. He also started 22nd at Mansfield Motorsports Speedway, and finished 34th with motor problems.

He started two Busch series races in 2007. He started 32nd and crashed out finishing 34th in his home race at the Milwaukee Mile. He started 38th at Gateway International Raceway, and finished 38th with brake problems.

Early in 2007 Kreyer announced that he would be attempting to qualify the Mac Hill Motorsports car for four NASCAR Busch Series races in 2007. He made all four races and had a best finish of 28th at O'Reilly Raceway Park.

Images

Motorsports career results

NASCAR
(key) (Bold – Pole position awarded by qualifying time. Italics – Pole position earned by points standings or practice time. * – Most laps led.)

Busch Series

Craftsman Truck Series

References

External links
 
 NASCAR statistics at Fox Sports, Retrieved May 17, 2007
 Culvers press release "Kreyer and Culver's racing achieve NASCAR goal: qualify, race and finish Kroger 250", Retrieved May 17, 2007
 Drivers page for Mac Hill Motorsports, Retrieved May 17, 2007

Living people
1970 births
People from Wisconsin Dells, Wisconsin
Racing drivers from Wisconsin
NASCAR drivers
ARCA Midwest Tour drivers
People from Juneau County, Wisconsin
People from Pardeeville, Wisconsin